Carex peregrina is a species of sedge (family Cyperaceae), with a remarkably disjunct distribution; it is found in the Azores and Madeira islands in the eastern Atlantic, and more than  away in the mountains of Ethiopia, Kenya, Uganda and Tanzania, in east Africa.

References

peregrina
Afromontane flora
Flora of the Azores
Flora of Madeira
Flora of Ethiopia
Flora of East Tropical Africa
Plants described in 1827